A Touch of Reverence is a 1974 Australian mini-series about an Anglican minister.

References

External links

1970s Australian television miniseries
Films directed by Carl Schultz
1974 Australian television series debuts
1974 Australian television series endings